Real Madrid Baloncesto (English: Real Madrid Basketball) is a Spanish professional basketball club that was founded in 1931, as a division of the Real Madrid CF multi sports club. They play domestically in the Liga ACB, and internationally in the EuroLeague.

Similarly to the Real Madrid athletic association's football club, the basketball team has been the most successful of its peers in both Spain and Europe. Real Madrid CF is the only European sports club to have become the European champions in both football and basketball in the same season.

The Real Madrid squads have won a record 36 Spanish League championships, including in 7-in-a-row and 10-in-a-row sequences. They have also won a record 28 Spanish Cup titles, a record 10 EuroLeague Championships, a record 4 Saporta Cups, and a record 5 Intercontinental Cups.

Madrid has also won 3 Triple Crowns, which constitute a treble of the national league, cup, and continental league won in a single season. Some of the club's star players over the years have included: Arvydas Sabonis, Dražen Petrović, Rudy Fernández, Sergio Rodriguez, Serge Ibaka, Dražen Dalipagić, Nikola Mirotić, Juan Antonio Corbalán, Fernando Martín, Alberto Herreros, Dejan Bodiroga, and Luka Dončić.

Real Madrid also has a developmental basketball team, called Real Madrid B, that plays in the amateur-level Spanish 4th-tier Liga EBA.

History

History of great success: 1950s to 1980s

For at least half a century, Madrid has been a standard-bearer in European basketball, accumulating a record ten continental titles, based on its dominance in the 1960s. Its early dominance in Spain has resulted in another untouchable cache of 36 national domestic league and 28 national cup trophies. And almost every time that Madrid did not play in Europe's top-tier level competition, it won a different continental trophy – four Saporta Cups, a Korać Cup, and a ULEB Cup – as a stepping-stone back to the big time.

Players like Emiliano Rodríguez, Clifford Luyk, Wayne Brabender, Walter Szczerbiak, Juan Antonio Corbalán, Dražen Petrović, Mirza Delibašić, Arvydas Sabonis, and Dejan Bodiroga have turned Real Madrid into one of the biggest basketball clubs in the world. Madrid won as many as 7 EuroLeague titles between 1964 and 1980, becoming a European basketball club legend, and even when it took the club 15 years to win it again, it found success in other European competitions, too.

Madrid downed Olimpia Milano in the 1984 Cup Winners' Cup, on free throws made by Brian Jackson, then Petrović had 62 points in the 1989 Cup Winners' Cup final, against Snaidero Caserta. Madrid added a 1988 Korać Cup title, against Cibona Zagreb.

1990–2010

Real Madrid won the 1992 Saporta Cup trophy against PAOK, on a buzzer-beating jumper by Rickey Brown. It was not until Sabonis arrived in Madrid, when Real won its eighth EuroLeague title in 1995, by beating Olympiacos in the final. Madrid next won the 1997 Saporta Cup title against Verona, but no more European-wide trophies came for the club in the next decade.

Madrid still found success at home, winning Spanish League titles in 2000 and 2005. It all changed in 2007, when Joan Plaza was promoted to the club's head coach position. With the help of players like Louis Bullock, Felipe Reyes, and Álex Mumbrú, Madrid added a new trophy to its roll of honours, the ULEB Cup, as it won 12 of its last 13 games and downed Lietuvos Rytas by a score of 75–87 in the 2007 ULEB Cup Final. Moreover, Madrid finished in 2nd place in the 2006–07 Spanish League regular season, and stayed strong in its play in Palacio Vistalegre during the Spanish league playoffs; they lifted the club's 30th national league trophy by besting their arch-rivals, Winterthur FC Barcelona, 3–1 in the Spanish League title series in 2007.

2011–2022: Pablo Laso era

In Pablo Laso's era, Real Madrid Baloncesto managed to find consistent success. Spanish top-tier level players of the time, like Sergio Rodríguez and Rudy Fernández, were acquired by the club. Also, ACB Rising Star winner Nikola Mirotić was a part of the team's mix, along with Sergio Llull and Felipe Reyes, to give Real Madrid a strong home grown core of players. This group of players gave Real Madrid Baloncesto 6 Copa del Reys (Spanish Cup) titles, 7 Spanish Super Cup titles, 6 Liga ACB (Spanish League) titles, 2 EuroLeague championships, and an FIBA Intercontinental Cup championship.

On 17 May 2015, after waiting 20 years to win another EuroLeague championship, Real Madrid won the 2015 EuroLeague championship against Olympiacos. Madrid's Andrés Nocioni was named the Final Four MVP. This title was called La Novena. Following the EuroLeague title, the 2014–15 ACB season's championship was also won by Real. Because Real also won the national Spanish Cup and the national Spanish Supercup that season, the club won its first "Quadruble crown".

On 27 September 2015, 34 years after their last FIBA Intercontinental Cup title, Real Madrid won their fifth FIBA Intercontinental Cup trophy, after defeating the Brazilian League club Bauru. Sergio Llull was named the MVP of the tournament. Real Madrid thus made it a record five FIBA Intercontinental Cup titles won, and with the Intercontinental Cup title.

On 20 May 2018, Real Madrid conquered again the EuroLeague, achieving their tenth title ever. The considered major leader of the team that season would be a Slovenian guard/forward named Luka Dončić, who became the designated MVP of the EuroLeague on all accounts at 19 years old.

On 5 June 2022, Pablo Laso suffered a heart attack. Exactly one month later, Real Madrid parted ways with him citing "medical reasons exclusively" and adding that keeping him as a coach in his health condition would have been "a risk that this institution cannot assume". Laso left Real Madrid as one of the greatest coaches in the club's history, having won 22 titles, which ties him with Lolo Sainz in the second place for most trophies won with Real Madrid, only behind Pedro Ferrándiz with 27. Laso is also the coach who has managed the most games for Madrid (860), having won 659 of them. He was succeeded at Real Madrid's helm by his assistant Jesús Mateo.

Sponsorship naming
Real Madrid Otaysa 1990–1991
Real Madrid Asegurator 1991–1992
Real Madrid Teka 1992–2001

Home arenas

Estadio Chamartín (1931–1936), outdoor basketball court under the stands of Real Madrid football stadium.
Frontón Recoletos (1939–1952), first indoor court, an adapted basque pelota fronton located in Salamanca district.
Frontón Jai Alai (1952–1965), first big court and official headquarters of the club, also a converted fronton located in Los Jerónimos neighborhood.
Colegio Maravillas (1965), used during the construction of the new pavilion.
Pabellón de la Ciudad Deportiva del Real Madrid (1966–1986), first pavilion owned by the club, located in its training complex north of the city.
Palacio de Deportes de la Comunidad de Madrid (1986–1998).
Pabellón Parque Corredor (1998–1999), in the city of Torrejón de Ardoz, used during the renovation of the club pavilion.
Pabellón Raimundo Saporta (1999–2004), the renovated and renamed Pabellón de la Ciudad Deportiva.
Palacio Vistalegre (2004–2010).
Caja Mágica (2010–2011).
Palacio de Deportes – WiZink Center (2011–present).

Players

Current roster

Depth chart

Retired numbers

Naismith Memorial Basketball Hall of Famers
The following former Real Madrid players are inducted into the Naismith Memorial Basketball Hall of Fame:
 Dražen Dalipagić, G, 1982–1983, Inducted 2004
 Antonio Díaz-Miguel, F, 1958–1961, Inducted 1997
 Pedro Ferrándiz, coach, 1959–1962, 1964–1965, 1966–1975, Inducted 2007
 Dražen Petrović, G, 1988–1989, Inducted 2002
 Arvydas Sabonis, C, 1992–1995, Inducted 2011

Record holders

Head coaches

 Ángel Cabrera: 1930–33
 Juan Castellví: 1931–34
 Máximo Arnáiz: 1934–35
 Segundo Braña: 1935–36
 Cholo Méndez: 1939–43
 Anselmo López: 1943–45, 1946–47
 José Borrero: 1947–48
 Felipe Kaimo Calderón: 1948–49
 Freddy Borrás: 1949–1954
 Ignacio Pinedo: 1954–1958, 1990–1991
 Jacinto Ardevínez: 1958–1959
 Pedro Ferrándiz: 1959–1962, 1964–1965, 1966–1975
 Joaquín Hernández: 1962–1964
 Robert Busnel: 1965–1966
 Lolo Sainz: 1975–1989
 George Karl: 1989–1990, 1991–1992
  Wayne Brabender: 1990
 Ángel González Jareño: 1991. 
  Clifford Luyk: 1992–1994, 1998–1999
 Željko Obradović: 1994–1997
 Miguel Ángel Martín: 1997
 Tirso Lorente: 1998
 Sergio Scariolo: 1999–2002
 Javier Imbroda: 2002–2003
 Julio Lamas: 2003–2004
 Božidar Maljković: 2004–2006
 Joan Plaza: 2006–2009
 Ettore Messina: 2009–2011
 Emanuele Molin: 2011
 Pablo Laso: 2011–2022
 Jesús Mateo: 2022–present

Honours

Domestic competitions
Spanish League
 Winners (36): 1957, 1958, 1959–60, 1960–61, 1961–62, 1962–63, 1963–64, 1964–65, 1965–66, 1967–68, 1968–69, 1969–70, 1970–71, 1971–72, 1972–73, 1973–74, 1974–75, 1975–76, 1976–77, 1978–79, 1979–80, 1981–82, 1983–84, 1984–85, 1985–86, 1992–93, 1993–94, 1999–2000, 2004–05, 2006–07, 2012–13, 2014–15, 2015–16, 2017–18, 2018–19, 2021–22
 Runners-up (13):
Spanish Cup
 Winners (28): 1951, 1952, 1954, 1956, 1957, 1960, 1961, 1962, 1965, 1966, 1967, 1970, 1971, 1972, 1973, 1974, 1975, 1977, 1985, 1986, 1989, 1993, 2012, 2014, 2015, 2016, 2017, 2020
 Runners-up (23):
Spanish Super Cup
 Winners (9): 1984–85, 2012, 2013, 2014, 2018, 2019, 2020, 2021, 2022
 Runners-up (2):

European competitions
EuroLeague
 Winners (10): 1963–64, 1964–65, 1966–67, 1967–68, 1973–74, 1977–78, 1979–80, 1994–95, 2014–15, 2017–18
 Runners-up (9): 1961–62, 1962–63, 1968–69, 1974–75, 1975–76, 1984–85, 2012–13, 2013–14, 2021–22
 Semifinalists (7): 1958, 1960–61, 1969–70, 1970–71, 1971–72, 1980–81, 1986–87
 Third place (2): 1982–83, 2018–19
 Fourth place (7): 1976–77, 1978–79, 1985–86, 1992–93, 1995–96, 2010–11, 2016–17
 Final Four (12): 1967, 1993, 1995, 1996, 2011, 2013, 2014, 2015, 2017, 2018, 2019, 2022
FIBA Saporta Cup (defunct)
 Winners (4): 1983–84, 1988–89, 1991–92, 1996–97
 Runners-up (2): 1981–82, 1989–90
FIBA Korać Cup (defunct)
 Winners (1): 1987–88
 Runners-up (1): 1990–91
EuroCup
 Winners (1): 2006–07
 Runners-up (1): 2003–04
Latin Cup 
 Winners (1): 1953
 Runners-up (1): 1966
European Basketball Club Super Cup (semi-official, ACB International Tournament "Memorial Héctor Quiroga", defunct)
 Winners (3): 1984, 1988, 1989
 Runners-up (1): 1986
 Third place (2): 1983, 1985

Unofficial awards
Triple Crown
 Winners (3): 1964–65, 1973–74, 2014–15

Worldwide competitions
FIBA Intercontinental Cup
 Winners (5): 1976, 1977, 1978, 1981, 2015
 Runners-up (3): 1965*, 1968, 1970
 Third place (2): 1966, 1975
 Fourth place (3): 1969, 1974, 1980
McDonald's Championship
 Runners-up (1): 1988
 Third place (1): 1993
 Fourth place (1): 1995

* Unofficial edition

Regional competitions
Torneo Comunidad de Madrid
 Winners (20): 1984, 1985, 1986, 1987, 1989, 1991, 1994, 1995, 1997, 2000, 2004, 2005, 2006, 2007, 2008, 2009, 2010, 2011, 2012, 2013
 Runners-up (8):
Campeonato de Castilla
 Winners (11): 1933, 1942, 1943, 1944, 1948, 1949, 1950, 1953, 1954, 1956, 1957
 Runners-up (8):
Trofeo Marca
 Winners (8): 1957, 1958, 1961, 1962, 1963, 1964, 1966, 1967
 Runners-up (1):

Friendly competitions

FIBA International Christmas Tournament (Trofeo "Raimundo Saporta"-Memorial "Fernando Martín")
 26: 1967, 1968, 1969, 1970, 1972, 1973, 1974, 1975, 1976, 1977, 1978, 1980, 1981, 1985, 1986, 1987, 1990, 1991, 1992, 1995, 1996, 1997, 2000, 2003, 2004, 2006.
 7 Trofeo Costa del Sol: 2012, 2016, 2017, 2018, 2019, 2021, 2022.
 3 Trofeo Gol: 1941–42, 1942–43, 1943–44.
 3 Trofeo Teresa Herrera: 1987, 1989, 1991.
 3 Trofeo Ciudat de Zaragoza: 2005, 2011, 2014.
 2 Trofeo Montbrisson: 1959, 1960.
 2 Trofeos Open de París: 1961–62, 1962–63.
 2 Torneo de Navidad de Bruselas: 1948, 1950.
 2 Trofeo Diputación Valladolid: 1997, 2009.
 2 Torneo Ciudad de Córdoba: 2013, 2015. 
 2 Trofeo de Torneig de Bàsquet Junior Ciutat de L'Hospitalet: 2015, 2016.
 1 Copa Chapultepec: 1931.
 1 Torneo Primavera de Madrid: 1934.
 1 Trofeo Cupones Cork: 1946.
 1 Torneo Inauguración (Madrid): 1951.

 1 Torneo Bodas de Oro del Real Madrid: 1952.
 1 Torneo Bodas de Oro del Club: 1952.
 1 Trofeo Homenaje a Luis Moreno Melilla: 1952.
 1 Torneo Bodas de Plata de la Sección: 1955.
 1 Torneo Internacional de Portugal: 1955.
 1 Torneo de Vigo: 1956.
 1 Torneo Triangular: 1956.
 1 Torneo de Gijón: 1956.
 1 Trofeo XII Juegos del Sudeste (Alicante): 1960.
 1 Torneo de Casablanca: 1962.
 1 Trofeo Open de París: 1962.
 1 Trofeo Bodas de Plata del Canoe: 1965.
 1 Trofeo Breogán: 1967.
 1 Galardón As de Oro: 1977–78.
 1 Trofeo Nuevo Banco (Madrid): 1978.
 1 Torneo de la Pollinica (Málaga): 1985–86.
 1 Trofeo Memorial Gasca (San Sebastián): 1985–86.
 1 Torneo de San Julián (Cuenca): 1986–87.
 1 Trofeo 50 Aniversario Diario Sur: 1988.
 1 Trofeo Canal +: 1991.
 1 Trofeo Ciutat de Palma: 2007

 1 Torneo de Diada de Mallorca : 2008.
 1 San Sebastian, Spain Invitational Game : 2009. 
 1 La Nucia, Alicante, Spain Invitational Game: 2010.
 1 Torneo Sportquarters de Guadalajara: 2012.
 1 Torneo Spa Porta Maris & Suites del Mar: 2012.
 1 Trofeo Grupo Dalmau Vaquer: 2014.
 1 Copa EuroAmericana: 2014.
 1 Arganda del Rey, Spain Invitational Game: 2017.
 1 Burgos, Spain Invitational Game: 2018.
 1 Torneo San Mateo: 2019.
 1 Trofeo Memorial Jose Luis Abos: 2019.

Individual awards

ACB Most Valuable Player
Arvydas Sabonis – 1994, 1995
Dejan Bodiroga – 1998
Tanoka Beard – 1999
Felipe Reyes – 2009, 2015
Nikola Mirotić – 2013
Sergio Llull – 2017
Luka Dončić – 2018
ACB Finals MVP
Arvydas Sabonis – 1993, 1994
Alberto Angulo – 2000
Louis Bullock – 2005
Felipe Reyes – 2007, 2013
Sergio Llull – 2015, 2016
Rudy Fernández – 2018
Facundo Campazzo – 2019
Edy Tavares – 2022
All-ACB First Team
Elmer Bennett – 2004
Felipe Reyes – 2007, 2008, 2009, 2015
Ante Tomić – 2011
Sergio Llull – 2012, 2015, 2017
Rudy Fernández – 2013, 2014
Nikola Mirotić – 2013, 2014
Sergio Rodríguez – 2013, 2014, 2016
Luka Dončić – 2018
Facundo Campazzo – 2019, 2020
Edy Tavares – 2019, 2021
All-ACB Second Team
Gustavo Ayón – 2016
Anthony Randolph – 2017
Facundo Campazzo – 2018
Edy Tavares – 2020, 2022
ACB Three Point Shootout Champion
Alberto Herreros – 1998, 1999
Alberto Angulo – 2000
Louis Bullock – 2004, 2006, 2008
Jaycee Carroll – 2015, 2016
ACB Slam Dunk Champion
Mickaël Gelabale – 2004, 2005
ACB Most Spectacular Player of the Year
Rudy Fernández – 2013
Sergio Rodríguez – 2014

Spanish Cup MVP
Sergio Llull – 2012, 2017
Nikola Mirotić – 2014
Rudy Fernández – 2015
Gustavo Ayón – 2016
Facundo Campazzo – 2020
Spanish Supercup MVP
Rudy Fernández – 2012
Sergio Rodríguez – 2013
Sergio Llull – 2014, 2018, 2021
Facundo Campazzo – 2019, 2020
Edy Tavares – 2022
EuroLeague MVP
Sergio Rodríguez – 2014
Sergio Llull – 2017
Luka Dončić – 2018
EuroLeague Final Four MVP
Arvydas Sabonis – 1995
Andrés Nocioni – 2015
Luka Dončić – 2018
FIBA Intercontinental Cup MVP
Walter Szczerbiak – 1977
Sergio Llull – 2015
All-EuroLeague First Team
Rudy Fernández – 2013, 2014
Sergio Rodríguez – 2014
Felipe Reyes – 2015
Sergio Llull – 2017
Luka Dončić – 2018
Edy Tavares – 2021, 2022
All-EuroLeague Second Team
Sergio Llull – 2011
Nikola Mirotić – 2013, 2014
Rudy Fernández – 2015
Gustavo Ayón – 2016, 2017
Edy Tavares – 2019
EuroLeague Rising Star
Nikola Mirotić – 2011, 2012
Luka Dončić – 2017, 2018
Usman Garuba – 2021
EuroLeague Best Defender
Edy Tavares – 2019, 2021

Season by season

International record

Notable players
Players who are currently on the team are in boldface. Players who are still active, but in other team, are in italics.

 Santi Abad
 Pablo Aguilar
 Juan Aísa
 Alberto Angulo
 Lucio Angulo
 José Miguel Antúnez
 Alberto Aspe
 José Biriukov
 Wayne Brabender
 Antonio Bueno
 Miguel Ángel Cabral
 Marcos Carbonell
 Pep Cargol
 Juan Antonio Corbalán
 Alfonso del Corral
 Rudy Fernández
 Martín Ferrer
 Alberto Férriz
 Víctor Férriz
 José Luis Galilea
 Carlos García
 Héctor García
 Javier García Coll
 Óscar González
 Tomás González
 Juan Antonio Hernández
 Raúl Hernández
 Eduardo Hernández-Sonseca
 Alberto Herreros
 Serge Ibaka
 Iker Iturbe
 José Lasa
 José Luis Llorente
 Toño Llorente
 Sergio Llull
 Daniel López
 Juanjo López
 Raúl López
 Juan Manuel López Iturriaga
 Clifford Luyk
 Antonio Martín
 Fernando Martín
 Jan Martín
 Fernando Mateo
 Nikola Mirotić
 Juan Antonio Morales
 Álex Mumbrú
 Roberto Núñez
 Juan Antonio Orenga
 Alfonso Reyes
 Felipe Reyes
 Carlos Rodríguez
 Emiliano Rodríguez
 Marcos Rodríguez
 Sergio Rodríguez
 Johnny Rogers
 Fernando Romay
 Nacho Romero
 Quique Ruiz Paz
 Rafael Rullán
 Lolo Sainz
 Ismael Santos
 Lorenzo Sanz
 Carlos Sevillano
 José María Silva
 Mike Smith
 Enrique Suárez
 Francisco Velasco
 Enrique Villalobos
 Facundo Campazzo
 Pablo Prigioni
 Andrés Nocioni
 Lucas Victoriano
 Jaycee Carroll
 Axel Hervelle
 Éric Struelens
 Mirza Delibašić
 Damir Mulaomerović
 Bojan Bogdanović
 Dontaye Draper
 Dražen Petrović
 Mario Stojić
 Žan Tabak
 Marko Tomas
 Ante Tomić
 Alain Digbeu
 Mickaël Gelabale
 Moustapha Sonko
 Andrew Betts
 Ioannis Bourousis
 Antonios Fotsis
 Pat Burke
 Jay Larrañaga
 Kaspars Kambala
 Arvydas Sabonis
 Rimas Kurtinaitis
 Darjuš Lavrinovič
 Rimantas Kaukėnas
 Martynas Pocius
 Jonas Mačiulis
 Gustavo Ayón
 Blagota Sekulić
 Nedžad Sinanović
 Rolf van Rijn
 Maciej Lampe
 Johnny Báez
 Freddy Borrás
 José Ortiz
 Guillermo Galíndez
 Rafael Deliz
 Toñín Casillas
 William Brindle
 Mikhail Mikhailov
 Dejan Bodiroga
 Dražen Dalipagić
 Aleksandar Đorđević
 Nikola Lončar
 Igor Rakočević
 Zoran Savić
 Dragan Tarlać
 Dušan Vukčević
 Luka Dončić
 Anthony Randolph
 Salah Mejri
 Kerem Tunçeri
 Miles Aiken
 Derrick Alston
 Michael Anderson
 Joe Arlauckas
 Tanoka Beard
 Elmer Bennett
 Louis Bullock
 Josh Fisher
 Brian Jackson
 Charles Smith
 Larry Spriggs
 Walter Szczerbiak
 Juan Castellvi

Players in the NBA draft

Historical uniforms

Matches against NBA teams

See also

Real Madrid–FC Barcelona rivalry
Real Madrid–Estudiantes rivalry
2007 NBA Europe Live Tour
2009 NBA Europe Live Tour

Notes and references

Notes

External links

 Real Madrid at acb.com 
 Real Madrid at euroleaguebasketball.net

 
Basketball teams in the Community of Madrid
Liga ACB teams
Basketball teams established in 1931
EuroLeague clubs
EuroLeague-winning clubs
1931 establishments in Spain